Eric Lee (born April 10, 1983) is a former professional Canadian football running back. He was drafted by the Edmonton Eskimos in the fifth round of the 2009 CFL Draft. He played college football for the Weber State Wildcats.

1983 births
Living people
Canadian football running backs
Weber State Wildcats football players
Edmonton Elks players
Canadian players of American football
Ghanaian sportspeople
Canadian people of Ghanaian descent